Kishtudak is a village in Sughd Region, northern Tajikistan. It is part of the jamoat Yori in the city of Panjakent. It is located near the RB12 highway.

References

Populated places in Sughd Region